A650 may refer to:
Breda A650, a type of subway car
A650 road (Great Britain)
, a French naval schooner
Bundesautobahn 650, a German federal motorway